Capital Voice was a private radio station based in Mogadishu, Somalia. It was part of the HornAfrik Media Inc network, which also operated another radio station, a television station, a website and a training research center.

References

Defunct radio stations
HornAfrik Media Inc

Defunct_mass_media_in_Somalia